Black Samson is a 1974 American blaxploitation film, starring Rockne Tarkington, Carol Speed, William Smith and Connie Strickland. The film was written by Daniel B. Cady (who also produced) and Warren Hamilton Jr., directed by Charles Bail and released by Warner Bros. It was the directorial debut for Bail, more commonly billed as Chuck Bail, a renowned stunt co-ordinator best known for playing himself in Richard Rush's The Stunt Man.

Plot
Armed with a quarterstaff and his pet African lion named Hoodoo, noble nightclub owner Samson (Rockne Tarkington) does his best to keep his neighborhood clean of crime and drugs. When vicious mobster Giovanni "Johnny" Nappa (William Smith) tries to muscle in on Samson's territory, Samson takes a stand against Nappa and his flunkies.

Cast
 Rockne Tarkington as Samson
 William Smith as Giovanni "Johnny" Nappa
 Connie Strickland as Tina
 Carol Speed as Leslie
 Michael Payne as Arthur
 Joe Tornatore as Harry
 Titos Vandis as Giuseppe "Joe" Nappa
 Napoleon Whiting as Henry "Old Henry"
 John Alderman as Michael Briggs
 Fred Scheiwiller as Charlie Frisco
 Ernest Robinson as "Ragamuffin"
 Kenneth Crowe as Vic
 Nick Dimitri as Milo
 Ken Bell as C.T.
 Junero Jennings as "Shine"
 Marvin Walters as Junkie
 Shelley St. Clair as Nappa's Secretary
 Gene Lebell as Nappa's Gang Member
 Bob Minor as Samson's Street People

See also
 List of American films of 1974

External links

1974 films
Blaxploitation films
American crime thriller films
1970s crime thriller films
Warner Bros. films
American exploitation films
1970s English-language films
Films directed by Charles Bail
1970s American films